is an interchange railway station in Higashi-ku and Chikusa-ku, Nagoya, Aichi Prefecture, Japan, operated by Central Japan Railway Company (JR Tōkai)  and the Transportation Bureau City of Nagoya.

Lines
The above-ground portion off Chikusa Station is served by the Chūō Main Line, and is located 389.8 kilometers from the starting point of the line at Tokyo Station and 7.1 kilometers from Nagoya Station. the underground portion of the station is served by the Higashiyama Line of the Nagoya Municipal Subway and is 11.0 kilometers from the starting point of that line at Takabata Station.

Layout
The JR station has one elevated island platform with the station building underneath. The station building has automated ticket machines, TOICA automated turnstiles and a staffed ticket office. The underground portion the station has two opposed side platforms. The station building has automated ticket machines, Manaca automated turnstiles and a staffed ticket office.

Platforms (JR Central)

Platforms (Nagoya Municipal Subway)

Adjacent stations

|-
!colspan=5|JR Central

Station history
The JR portion of the station opened on July 25, 1900. The subway portion of the station opened on June 15, 1960.

Passenger statistics
In fiscal 2017, the JR portion of the station was used by an average of 19,892 passengers daily and the Nagoya Subway portion of the station by 14,234 passengers daily.

Surrounding area
The station is located near the border of Chikusa-ku, Higashi-ku and Naka-ku.

See also
 List of railway stations in Japan

References

External links
 
JR Tokai official home page
Nagoya Subway official home page

Chikusa-ku, Nagoya
Railway stations in Japan opened in 1900
Railway stations in Aichi Prefecture
Railway stations in Japan opened in 1960
Chūō Main Line
Stations of Central Japan Railway Company
Railway stations in Nagoya